Mirza Hashem Eshkevari was a Shi'a philosopher, jurist and mystic. He is one of the most important pupils of Agha Muhammad reza Qomshehi and his mystical school.

Early life
He was born in Eshkevar at Gilan. Eshkevar had given rise to scientists such as Qutb Al Din Eshkevari and Sayyed Abul Qasem Eshkevari. He was born there in 1250 Hijra lunar. His family lineage goes back to the regress of Sadat.

Education
He traveled for learning and education. He began in Eshkevar then went to Qazvin to participate in the class of eminent master of jurisprudence, Aqa Sayyed Ali who prepared a glossary on the book of Qavanin. He traveled to Tehran to take part in the class of eminent masters of mysticism Aqa Ali Modarres and Mirza Abul Hasan Jeleveh. He taught for many years in the seminary of Sepah salar in Teran. He helped transform Islamic wisdom to other classes.

Pupils
He educated many eminent pupils in different majors of Islamic sciences particularly mysticism and Islamic philosophy such as Mirza Ahmad, Ashtiyyani, Mirza Mehdi Ashtiyyani and Aqa Bozorg Hakim.

Works
Most of his books are written in Arabic. These books are primarily concerned with mystical and philosophical contents. Some of them are:
A Glossary of Meftah Al Qayb
 A Glossary on Mefath Al Ons
A Treatise on the Necessary Existence
 A Treatise on Secret Points

Death
He died of illness in 1293.

See also
Islamic philosophy
Islamic scholars
List of Iranian philosophers
Mirza Mahdi Ashtiani

References

External links
Ensani.ir

13th-century Iranian philosophers
Iranian writers
Iranian Muslim mystics